Cowboy in Sweden is the soundtrack album to the 1970 television special of the same name starring Lee Hazlewood, released in 1970. In 2016, the album was reissued by Light in the Attic Records with additional bonus tracks.

Critical reception

Stephen Thomas Erlewine of AllMusic gave the album 4 stars out of 5, saying: "At its core, it's a collection of country and cowboy tunes, much like the work he did with Nancy Sinatra, but the production is cinematic and psychedelic, creating a druggy, discombobulated sound like no other."

Track listing

Personnel
Credits adapted from liner notes.

 Lee Hazlewood – vocals, arrangement, production
 Nina Lizell – vocals (2, 6, 11)
 Suzi Jane Hokom – vocals (8)
 Johnny Arthy – arrangement
 Craig Doerge – arrangement
 Clark Gassman – arrangement
 Lars Samuelsson – arrangement
 David Whitaker – arrangement
 David Anderle – production (7)
 Larry Marks – associate production
 Donnie Owens – associate production
 Jack Robinson – associate production
 Shel Talmy – associate production
 Mickey Crofford – engineering
 Eddie Brackett – engineering

References

External links
 
 

1970 albums
Lee Hazlewood albums
Albums produced by Lee Hazlewood
LHI Records albums
Light in the Attic Records albums